Odiellus spinosus is a species of harvestmen in the family Phalangiidae.

Description
This harvestmen shows three large, almost flat spines (hence the species name) in front of the eyes and a black-edged saddle on the back. Moreover the abdomen is distinctly flattened, with some rows of brown spots across each tergite.

Biology
Adults can be found from June and until December.

References

Harvestmen
Animals described in 1792